Raphael dos Santos Macena (born 25 February 1989) is a Brazilian professional footballer who plays as a forward for Mirassol.

Club statistics

References

External links

1989 births
Living people
Brazilian footballers
Brazilian expatriate footballers
Expatriate footballers in Japan
Expatriate footballers in Greece
Brazilian expatriate sportspeople in Japan
Brazilian expatriate sportspeople in Greece
J2 League players
Campeonato Brasileiro Série B players
Campeonato Brasileiro Série C players
Esporte Clube Bahia players
Votoraty Futebol Clube players
União São João Esporte Clube players
Paulista Futebol Clube players
Shonan Bellmare players
Ceará Sporting Club players
Guarani FC players
Comercial Futebol Clube (Ribeirão Preto) players
Esporte Clube XV de Novembro (Piracicaba) players
Esporte Clube Juventude players
Rio Claro Futebol Clube players
Kallithea F.C. players
Luverdense Esporte Clube players
União Recreativa dos Trabalhadores players
Veranópolis Esporte Clube Recreativo e Cultural players
Association football forwards